The Bala transmitting station is a facility for television transmission sited about 6 km east of the town of Bala in Gwynedd, Wales. It consists of a self-supporting 45 m lattice steel mast standing on high ground about 310 m above sea level. It is owned and operated by Arqiva.

Currently the site provides digital TV to the area.

History
The station was built by the ITA in 1967 to provide a 405-line ITV Band III (VHF) TV service for the area, and was officially classed as a relay of Preseli.

In December 1974 the site became a low power UHF analogue colour television relay of Moel y Parc; at that time carrying BBC1, BBC2 and ITV. S4C was added in 1982.

The 405-line TV system was finally discontinued in the UK in 1985, but Bala's VHF transmitters were decommissioned a year early: in 1984.

Digital switchover at Bala happened between 28 October 2009 and 25 November 2009, mirroring events at the Moel y Parc parent station.

Channels listed by frequency

Analogue television

26 July 1967 – December 1974
All the official documentation claims that Bala was originally classed as a relay of Presely (which is about 130 km to the south west). However, it is likely that the VHF signal from Presely would not be receivable at the Bala site, and neither would the signal from Presely's off-air repeater at Arfon due in both cases to considerable obstruction by mountain ranges. The Moel-y-Parc transmitter is however only 35 km to the north east, and it is line-of-sight to Bala. Logic says that the 405-line signal was therefore sourced from Moel y Parc, but with the official records saying otherwise it is being shown as a relay of Presely here.

There is an argument to say that Moel-y-Parc was a relay of Presely in the 405-line era in that the signal for Moel y Parc came in on an SHF link from Arfon, but since Arfon was an off-air relay of Preseli, that would make Moel-y-Parc an indirect off-air relay of Presely. But the official records list Moel-y-Parc as a 405-line main station (with no ITV repeaters).

December 1974 – 1 November 1982
With the coming of colour TV on 625 lines, Bala officially became a relay of Moel-y-Parc, whilst continuing to relay Presely's VHF transmission.

1 November 1982 – 3 July 1984
1982 saw the rollout of the UK's 4th planned UHF television channel. As with all Welsh transmitters, Bala was required to carry S4C instead of Channel 4 which is broadcast to the rest of the United Kingdom.

3 July 1984 – 21 October 2009
After 17 years of VHF television from this site, the service was discontinued on 3 July 1984. On UHF, Bala was destined only ever to transmit the originally-planned four of the eventual five analogue terrestrial television channels.

Analogue and digital television

28 October 2009 – 25 November 2009
There never was a pre-DSO digital TV service from Bala.

DSO for the repeaters of Moel-y-Parc occurred between 28 October & 25 November 2009. As a first step, BBC Two Analogue was switched off, and the digital BBC Mux A took over on that channel.

Digital television

18 November 2009–present
The analogue television transmissions from Bala ceased permanently and were replaced by digital transmissions.

See also
:Category:Transmitter sites in the United Kingdom
List of masts
List of tallest buildings and structures in Great Britain

References

External links
 MB21's page on 405 TV to Wales and the West
 405 Alive's list of transmitters
 More details on 405-line ITV transmitters
 The Transmission Gallery: Photographs and Information

Buildings and structures in Gwynedd
Transmitter sites in Wales
Llandderfel